Trigonoptera leptura is a species of beetle in the family Cerambycidae. It was described by Gestro in 1876, originally under the genus Arsysia.

References

Tmesisternini
Beetles described in 1876